The 2012 Notre Dame Fighting Irish football team represented the University of Notre Dame in the 2012 NCAA Division I FBS football season. The team was coached by Brian Kelly and played its home games at Notre Dame Stadium in South Bend, Indiana. They competed as an independent.

Despite starting the season unranked, the Fighting Irish ended the regular season with a 12–0 record. Led by Heisman Trophy finalist and Butkus Award winner Manti Te'o, the Irish finished with the number one defense in the country, giving up just 10.3 points per game. They played in the BCS National Championship Game with a chance to win their first national title since 1988 but were defeated by the Alabama Crimson Tide.

All wins in the 2012 and 2013 seasons and its loss in the 2013 BCS National Championship Game were later vacated for use of ineligible players.

Before the season

Previous season

2012 NFL draft
Notre Dame had 4 players selected in the 2012 NFL Draft. In the 1st round, the Arizona Cardinals selected Michael Floyd and the Minnesota Vikings selected Harrison Smith. In the 5th round, the Vikings selected Robert Blanton and the San Francisco 49ers selected Darius Fleming.

Transfers out / departures
Senior quarterback Dayne Crist was granted a release from the team by Brian Kelly to explore transfer options in December 2011. He decided to join his former Notre Dame head coach, Charlie Weis, at the University of Kansas. Aaron Lynch also transferred out of the program to USF. Cornerback Tee Shepherd left the school less than two months after his early enrollment.  Jordan Prestwood, an offensive tackle who transferred from FSU, sat out the 2011 season, and was also eligible to play in 2012, departed the team. Brad Carrico also departed the team after a foot injury and was granted a medical hardship after failing to recover from a foot surgery.

Transfers in
Amir Carlisle, a freshman Running Back for USC, transferred to Notre Dame in January. The NCAA approved his waiver request in March, enabling him to play this fall. Joshua Williams, a quarterback and kick returner for UT, transferred to Notre Dame in the summer.

Coaching changes
Notre Dame lost a few coaches to other schools in the off season. Running Backs coach Tim Hinton and Offensive Line and Run game coordinator Ed Warriner left to take positions with Ohio State University. Offensive coordinator and Quarterbacks Coach Charley Molnar left to take the head coach position at University of Massachusetts. There were also coaching changes within the staff. Bob Diaco became assistant head coach. Chuck Martin took over as Offensive Coordinator and Quarterbacks coach. Scott Booker came down from being an intern to Tight Ends And Special Teams Coach. There were some outside hires to fill positions on the staff as well. Bob Elliott was hired from Iowa State to coach the safeties, and Harry Hiestand was hired from Tennessee to be offensive line coach and Run Game Coordinator.

Recruiting class
Brian Kelly received 17 commitments in his second full recruiting class. Those include commitments from three early-enrollees: defensive tackle Sheldon Day, quarterback Gunner Kiel, and cornerback Tee Shepard.

Personnel

Coaching staff

Roster

Schedule

Game summaries

Navy (Emerald Isle Classic)

Irish running backs Theo Riddick and George Atkinson both ran for two scores and defensive end Stephon Tuitt returned a fumble 77 yards for another TD as Notre Dame routed Navy 50–10 in Notre Dame's season opener in Ireland. A crowd of 49,000, mostly visiting Americans, filled Dublin's Aviva Stadium for the first U.S. college game in Ireland since 1996, when the same two teams played in the Emerald Isle Classic at Croke Park. The Fighting Irish dominated the game, running the ball for 293 yards and 6.4 yards per carry against Navy's defense. Riddick gained 107 yards on 19 carries, Atkinson 99 yards on just nine carries. Irish quarterback Everett Golson, making his first start, put the Fighting Irish up 27–0 with a 5-yard end zone jump ball to tight end Tyler Eifert, who beat two smaller Navy defenders. Navy managed a 26-yard field goal before halftime and opened the second half with a nifty three-pass drive capped by Shawn Lynch's 25-yard grab to make it 27–10 but could get no closer.

Notre Dame's defensive leader, inside linebacker Manti Te'o, recovered one fumble and intercepted Navy quarterback Trey Miller's final pass of the day, an underthrown ball into triple coverage. Surprisingly, they were his first fumble recovery and interception, respectively, of his four-year Notre Dame career. Irish starters Tommy Rees and Carlo Calabrese did not make the trip due to violating team and university rules regarding an off campus incident with Indiana police last Spring. Cierre Wood, Notre Dame's starting running back from a year ago, also did not play due to being suspended the first two games of the season for violating team rules.

The game was officially tied to an Irish tourism initiative called The Gathering, which seeks to encourage members of the Irish diaspora (especially in the U.S.) to visit their ancestral home in 2013. Unlike the 1996 meeting, the 2012 game was aired live in parts of Europe as well as the U.S.

Purdue

Following Notre Dame's dominant performance against Navy, the Irish found themselves in a dogfight versus their in-state rival Purdue, a team they had beaten soundly the year before 38–10. After a scoreless first quarter, Irish quarterback Everett Golson led the Irish on an 88-yard scoring play in the second quarter with three big third-down conversions to take a 7–0 lead. Golson scrambled on the first one, avoided two rushers and then hit tight end Troy Niklas on a 30-yard pass. Three plays later, on another third down, he found DaVaris Daniels behind the Boilermaker defense for a 41-yard gain to the 9. On a third-and-goal, Golson rolled right and made a dive for the end zone as he was being hit right at the goal line. Officials initially ruled him out of bounds, but after a video review the call on the field was reversed and he was awarded a touchdown because he hit the pylon. The Boilermakers alternated quarterbacks Caleb TerBush and Robert Marve throughout the game. Marve led the Boilermakers on a quick 58-yard scoring drive at the end of the first half that started with Raheem Mostert's 41-yard kickoff return. Marve then hit O. J. Ross with a 16-yarder and, on a third-and-goal from the 2, he found Antavian Edison in the corner of the end zone with nine seconds to play in the half to tie the game at 7–7.

In the third quarter, Golson found tight end Tyler Eifert for passes of 22 and 25 yards that carried them to the 3-yard line, where he tossed a touchdown pass to T. J. Jones for a 14–7 lead. The Irish would also add a Kyle Brindza field goal in the third quarter to take a 17–7 lead. in the fourth quarter, Purdue came roaring back with a field goal and then a TerBush 15-yard TD pass to Edison with 2:12 left to tie the game at 17–17. The late score was set up by Josh Johnson's recovery of a Golson fumble. Golson was shaken up on the play and having trouble gripping the ball, so the Irish turned to Tommy Rees, who was returning from a one-game suspension as a second stringer. The former starting quarterback got one chance and produced a last-minute drive that led to a 20–17 victory over the Boilermakers on Kyle Brindza's 27-yard field goal with seven seconds to go.

Michigan State

No. 20 Notre Dame got off to its best start since 2002, beating No. 10 Michigan State 20–3 in East Lansing. The win marked the first time Notre Dame had beaten a top 10 squad since defeating Michigan in 2005. Everett Golson threw a touchdown pass and ran for a score in the first half to help down the Spartans. Golson was 14 of 32 for 178 yards and a TD, including 36-yard pass to John Goodman. He ran for a 6-yard TD early in the second quarter to give Notre Dame a 14–0 lead. The Irish shook off a sloppy start that included George Atkinson running into a teammate on a kickoff return, a false start and a timeout before their first snap. The Irish defense was dominant, sacking Spartan quarterback Andrew Maxwell three times in the second quarter alone. The Spartans were held to 77 total yards rushing and 178 yards passing and 3 total points.

Late in the 4th quarter, the Irish extended their lead when Kyle Brindza made a 29-yard field goal at the end of a time-consuming drive that took 6:21 off the clock and extended the score to 17–3. Michigan State's slim comeback hopes were dashed when Spartan running back Le'Veon Bell was going out of bounds and his lateral was caught by linebacker Manti Te'o with 4:20 left in the game to set up Brindza's 47-yard field goal that provided the 20–3 final score. Te'o also had a game-high 12 tackles, one for a loss, and broke up two passes, playing just a few days after the supposed death of his girlfriend, who he believed had lost a long battle with leukemia, and his grandmother. The Irish improved to 46–28–1 against the Spartans and broke the Spartans' 15-home game winning streak.

Michigan

After three consecutive last second Wolverine victories over the Irish, Notre Dame's defense stifled a 17th-ranked Denard Robinson led Michigan squad in a 13–6 victory. Manti Te'o led the Irish defensive effort with two interceptions as the 11th-ranked Fighting Irish picked off five Michigan passes and forced a fumble. Irish backup quarterback Tommy Rees sparked the Notre Dame offense after a shaky start by Everett Golson, who threw two interceptions of his own before being pulled by Coach Brian Kelly. Robinson, who amassed 948 yards of total offense in victories over the Irish past two years, wasn't as effective this time around as the Irish repeatedly forced him into mistakes. He threw four interceptions in the first half, then lost a fumble at the Notre Dame 8-yard line on the first drive of the second half.

The victory sent the Irish off to their best start (4–0) since 2002. The win also ended a streak of three straight games in which Michigan beat the Irish with a score in the final 27 seconds, the last two Michigan victories with Robinson at quarterback. Robinson finished 13-of-24 passing for 138 yards and also rushed for 90 yards on 26 carries. The victory belonged to the Irish defenders, who held a nationally-ranked opponent without a touchdown for a second straight week. Te'o finished with eight tackles, and safety Bennett Jackson had nine tackles, an interception and a fumble recovery. The Irish fans showed support for Te'o by wearing Hawaiian leis, after Te'o had suffered the death of his grandmother and girlfriend the previous week.

Miami (Shamrock Series)

Stanford

The Irish defense once again proved to be the strength of the 2012 Notre Dame team, stuffing Stanford on a classic goal line stand in an overtime thriller to down the Cardinal by a score of 20–13. After three years of being pushed around by the Cardinal, the Fighting Irish pushed back, winning the most important shoving match they had all season. A wall of Notre Dame defenders stopped Stanford running back Stepfan Taylor inches from the end zone on fourth and goal. Taylor went up the middle and was knocked back, but kept reaching and turning with bodies underneath him. It was unclear if his knee ever did hit the ground before reaching the ball across the goal line, but the officials on the field ruled Taylor's forward progress to be stopped before crossing the goal line. The celebration by the Irish crowd of 80,795 had to wait for a replay review. The call stood. Irish fans who weren't already on the field spilled out of the stands in celebration of the win.

Early on the game was a defensive battle. Notre Dame defensive tackle Stephon Tuitt was in the Stanford backfield all day and Manti Te'o was all over Stanford ball carriers. On the Cardinal side, Shayne Skov and Ben Gardner gave Irish quarterback Everett Golson and the Irish very little room to operate. Golson was inconsistent with his play, completing 12 of 24 for 141 yards and a touchdown. He also lost two key fumbles – one that Stanford's Chase Thomas recovered in the end zone in the second quarter for a touchdown and the other in the third that gave the Cardinal the ball back after Golson had made a long run deep into Stanford territory. Thomas' touchdown put Stanford up 7–3, the first time all season Notre Dame had trailed in a game. Notre Dame finally found the end zone on the first play of the fourth quarter. On a third-and-18 from the 24, Golson lofted a pass to the front corner of the end zone that the 6-foot-6 Irish tight end Tyler Eifert came down with for a 10–10 tie.

The Cardinal responded with their best drive of the game, a 16-play, 65-yard march that took 8:03 off the clock and reached the Notre Dame 3. The Irish got a stop on third down and Stanford had to settle for a field goal to take a three-point lead. On the ensuing possession, Golson would start the Irish drive down the field to tie or take the lead, but he took a helmet to the head during the drive to knock him out the game with concussion-like symptoms. Brian Kelly would again turn to Irish back up quarterback Tommy Rees, who had previously relieved Golson in the Purdue game and lead the Irish to a three-point win. Rees again responded to get the Irish into field goal range, completing an 11-yard pass to Eifert, and then, on third-and-4 from the 28, Eifert drew a pass-interference call on Terrence Brown that gave the Irish a first down at the 13. The Irish settled for Kyle Brindza's 22-yard field goal with 20 seconds left to tie it at 13. TJ Jones made a reaching 7-yard touchdown catch from Rees on the first overtime possession to give the Fighting Irish a 20–13 lead. Then the Fighting Irish defense, which had not given up a touchdown in four straight games, made its stand.

BYU

The Irish rushed for 270 yards against a Cougars defense that entered the game third in the nation against the rush. Theo Riddick ran for a career-high 143 yards, Cierre Wood ran for 114 yards and George Atkinson III scored the go-ahead touchdown as the Irish rallied for a 17–14 win. In the 1st quarter, Tommy Rees threw a 4-yard touchdown pass to Tyler Eifert to give the Irish a 7–0 lead. In the 2nd quarter, BYU quarterback Riley Nelson threw a pair of touchdown passes, the first to Cody Hoffman to tie the game, the second to Kaneakua Friel to give the Cougars a 14–7 lead. In the 3rd quarter, Kyle Brindza kicked a 24-yard field goal to get the Irish within 14–10. Brindza had missed two field goals earlier in the game. In the 4th quarter, Atkinson's touchdown run gave the Irish a 17–14 lead.

Oklahoma

Before the season began, the contest was regarded as one of the biggest games for both teams, and the Fighting Irish and Sooners did not disappoint. Both were regarded as dark horses for the national championship. Even though Notre Dame came in as the higher-rated team, many saw them as the underdog, due in part to the erratic play of starting quarterback Everett Golson. Using an up-tempo, no-huddle offense that forced the Notre Dame defense to play most of Oklahoma's first two drives out of their base package, Landry Jones led the Sooners down the field with ease. Only a bad snap on their first possession and a pass deflection in the red zone by Louis Nix on the second kept the Sooners from scoring more than a field goal halfway through the opening quarter. Notre Dame hit back two plays after falling behind 3–0, with Cierre Wood running up the middle for a 62-yard touchdown, the longest of the season for the Fighting Irish. The teams traded field goals in the second quarter, and the only other notable play took place near halftime, when an apparent Blake Bell touchdown was nullified by a holding call. Despite being down 10–6, Oklahoma had a 197–161 edge in yardage. Crucially however, the Sooners only had a net three rushing yards. On the Notre Dame side, Manti Te'o led all comers with 10 tackles and a sack, while Golson was putting together his most poised performance of the year.

Notre Dame missed a field goal at the end of a drive that consumed half of the third quarter, and the defense continued to stifle Oklahoma in the ground game, while surrendering yards but no points through the air. Early in the fourth quarter, Kyle Brindza made amends for he earlier miss by squeezing in a 44-yard field goal. A short punt on the next Irish possession gave Oklahoma a short field on which to respond. A 35-yard pass to Jalen Saunders and a surprise 4th down throw by Bell were key plays in setting up a 1-yard touchdown plunge by Bell, the first rushing score given up by the Notre Dame defense all season. It also ended an overall streak of 41 quarters without allowing a touchdown on the ground. Golson and the Irish responded immediately, with a 50-yard bomb to freshman speedster Chris Brown silencing the Oklahoma faithful. A few plays later, Golson put Notre Dame back on top 20–13 with a 1-yard burrowing run of his own.

The next Oklahoma drive produced the defining play of the game, as linebacker Dan Fox tipped the ball away from Saunders, and Te'o dove to snatch the interception only inches off the grass. This led to another Brindza field goal, and the Irish iced the game after gaining possession on downs, with a 15-yard jaunt by Theo Riddick accounting for the final margin of 30–13. Golson played his most complete game of the season, hitting 13 of 25 passes for 177 yards, while adding 64 yards and a touchdown rushing. Crucially, he did not turn the ball over once, with many of his incompletions occurring while throwing the ball away to avoid a sack or negative play; and the Irish converted nearly 50% of their third downs under his guidance. The Irish defense stood to the challenge as well, giving up no deep passing plays, and only 15 yards on the ground. The victory vaulted Notre Dame to No. 3 in the major polls.

Pittsburgh

Down 20–6 in the fourth quarter with its national title hopes on the line, Notre Dame rallied in triple overtime to defeat the Pitt Panthers and remain undefeated. Everett Golson scored on a quarterback sneak in the third overtime and the fourth-ranked Fighting Irish came back from a 14-point deficit for a 29–26 win.

Notre Dame avoided the fate of the 2002 team, the last Irish team to start a season 8–0, which was upset by Boston College 14–7. Brian Kelly pulled Golson late in the second quarter because he was missing reads and progressions. But the coach put Golson back in after backup Tommy Rees threw an interception, and the Irish fell behind by two touchdowns. A victory seemed unlikely when they fell behind 20–6 late in the third quarter. Golson threw an 11-yard touchdown pass to T. J. Jones early in the fourth quarter, as Notre Dame cut Pitt's lead to 20–12. Notre Dame's chances for a comeback appeared to end when Pitt cornerback K'Waun Williams intercepted a pass by Golson in the end zone. But the Irish defense held, and Golson completed a 45-yard pass to DaVaris Daniels on a broken play to get to the Pitt 5-yard line. Golson then threw a 5-yard touchdown pass to Theo Riddick and ran in for the two-point conversion to tie the game.

After the two teams traded field goals in the first overtime, Notre Dame looked poised to score for a victory, but running back Cierre Wood fumbled as he attempted to dive into the end zone in the second overtime and Pitt safety Jarred Holley recovered. But the Irish kept finding life, the last time when Kevin Harper missed a 33-yard field goal wide right following Wood's fumble. After Pitt would again kick a field goal in the third over time period, Golson would cap off the comeback with a 1-yard touchdown run. It was the fifth consecutive year that Notre Dame and Pittsburgh played a game decided by less than a touchdown – with two of those reaching overtime. Plus, of the last nine meetings between the schools, eight have been decided by eight points or fewer.

Boston College

Wake Forest

In 2011, Notre Dame won 24–17 in Winston-Salem. Notre Dame is now 2–0 against Wake Forest. With this victory, Notre Dame became this season's final undefeated major bowl-eligible team in college football.

USC

For the first time since its 1988 championship season, Notre Dame came into the Los Angeles Coliseum with a No. 1 ranking and a chance to play for the national title on the line against its biggest rival, the Trojans of Southern California. USC, who had beaten the Irish nine out of the last ten meetings, often in a lopsided fashion, was playing the unfamiliar role of spoiler. Picked by the AP as the preseason No. 1 team, the Trojans came into the game unranked for only the second time since 2001. Complicating matters, USC had to play without its four-year starting quarterback, Matt Barkley, who was lost to injury just the week before against its cross-town rival UCLA. USC Coach Lane Kiffin elected to start redshirt freshman Max Wittek at quarterback, who despite some late-game heroics, was outmatched against the No. 1 ranked Irish defense. In the final minutes of the game, down nine points, Wittek connected with USC's All-America wide receiver Marqise Lee to put the Trojans at the one-yard line with a chance to close the score to a one possession game. Notre Dame's impenetrable defense appropriately made a decisive stand keeping USC out of the end zone on four plays from the Irish 1 with 2:33 to play. After three straight runs yielded minuscule gains, Wittek threw incomplete to fullback Soma Vainuku, setting off a celebration on the Notre Dame sideline and in the Irish sections of the sold-out stadium.

The 22–13 win secured Brian Kelly's Notre Dame squad a trip to Miami to play in the National Championship game, its first in 24 years. Running back Theo Riddick led the Irish ground attack with 146 yards and a touchdown, Kyle Brindza kicked five field goals, and Everett Golson passed for 217 yards as the Irish completed their first perfect regular season since 1988. Southern Cal's much-criticized defense was exploited by the Irish, with Golson patiently finding the gaps in the Trojans' pass coverage for 181 yards passing in the first half. Riddick went 9 yards for a TD in the first quarter, but USC also stiffened to hold Notre Dame to field goals twice in the red zone. The Notre Dame defense held its 12th straight opponent without a first-quarter touchdown, but Wittek found Robert Woods for a 9-yard score on the first play of the second quarter – just the ninth touchdown allowed by Notre Dame all season long. The Irish took a 16–10 lead to halftime when Brindza hit the second-longest field goal in Notre Dame history. Irish linebacker Manti Te'o made the seventh interception of his phenomenal season when Wittek threw directly to him on USC's second play of the second half. Both teams struggled to move the ball in the third quarter, and USC settled for a field goal with 9:20 to play just a few moments after Kiffin called a timeout right before a play that ended with Lee appearing to catch a pass on the goal line. The Irish out-gained the Trojans in total yards 493–281, and time of possession by 9 minutes, but repeatedly, the Irish had to settle for field goals in the red zone, putting the outcome of the game somewhat in doubt until the Irish's spectacular goal line stand.

The game was watched by 16.1 million viewers on television.

Alabama (BCS National Championship Game)

Notre Dame's first time playing for the national championship since the 1988 season, when the Irish defeated West Virginia 34–21 at the Fiesta Bowl. Notre Dame was 5–1 all time vs. Alabama entering the game, while Alabama under Nick Saban had won two of the last three national championships. The Fighting Irish lost, 42–14.

Rankings

Post season

Awards
All-Americans

NCAA sanctions
In 2018, the NCAA launched its own investigation and saw that Notre Dame had used ineligible players this season as well as the succeeding season. As a result, the Irish had to vacate all wins from this season as well as the next one. These sanctions are highly disputed. If not for the artificial removal of these wins, Notre Dame would have the highest winning percentage in college football

References

 
 

Notre Dame
Notre Dame Fighting Irish football seasons
Notre Dame Fighting Irish football